Jewell Williams (born September 8, 1957) is a Democratic politician, formerly serving as the Sheriff of Philadelphia. He is a former member of the Pennsylvania House of Representatives, representing the 197th District from 2001 to 2012.

References

External links
Follow the Money - Jewell Williams
2006 2004 2002 2000 campaign contributions

1957 births
Living people
African-American sheriffs
African-American state legislators in Pennsylvania
Holy Family University
Democratic Party members of the Pennsylvania House of Representatives
Sheriffs of Philadelphia
21st-century American politicians
21st-century African-American politicians
20th-century African-American people